"Amerika" is a song by German Neue Deutsche Härte band Rammstein. It was released on 6 September 2004 as the second single from their fourth studio album, Reise, Reise (2004). The song peaked at number 2 in Germany and entered the top 5 in Austria, Denmark, and Switzerland.

Content
The song deals with the worldwide cultural and political imperialism of the United States of America. The song's text and most video images point unambiguously toward a critique of America's cultural imperialism, political propaganda and self-assumed role as global police force. The two verses are sung in German with a chorus in Denglisch: We're all living in Amerika, Amerika ist wunderbar, We're all living in Amerika, Amerika, Amerika and We're all living in Amerika, Coca-Cola, sometimes war.  The band views it as a satirical commentary on Americanization, and the lyrics refer to such things considered American as  Coca-Cola, Wonderbra, Santa Claus, and Mickey Mouse. Uncharacteristically for Rammstein, the song incorporates an interlude in which the lyrics explicitly state the band's intentions: This is not a love song, This is not a love song, I don't sing my mother tongue, No this is not a love song.

Video
The video shows the band in Apollo-era space suits on the Moon, with shots of other cultures acting like stereotypical Americans, satirizing Americanization. These shots include Africans eating pizza and making Christmas wishes to Santa Claus, Buddhist monks eating hamburgers, South East Asians, Japanese, Native Americans, Inuit, Aboriginal Australians, an Indian Sikh man smoking a cigarette and a Muslim man worshipping in front of an oil refinery after removing his Nike sneakers. Near the end, various ethnic groups sing and dance along. The end of the video shows that the band have actually been in a fake moon set in a studio, complete with film crew, an allusion to the Moon landing conspiracy theories. Till Lindemann, Rammstein's lead singer, wears a space suit with the name "Armstrong" on it, a reference to Neil Armstrong. The video ends with a band photograph left behind on the moon's surface while the recording of Jack Swigert's quote "Houston, we've had a problem here" is being played.

Live performance
As with every song from Reise, Reise (except "Ohne dich"), "Amerika" debuted live in three consecutive concerts for members of the Rammstein fan club. During the live performances of this song on tour, Flake is often seen riding around on a Segway PT with confetti cannons firing red, white and blue confetti in a parody of a ticker-tape parade. It was the last song of the band's main set, and was played at every concert of the Reise, Reise tour. During a concert in Gothenburg, Sweden on July 30, 2005, frontman Till Lindemann suffered a knee injury when keyboardist Flake accidentally ran into him with the Segway PT; this caused concerts scheduled in Asia to be cancelled.

Track listing

Charts

Weekly charts

Year-end charts

Certifications

See also
 List of anti-war songs

References

Anti-American sentiment in Germany
2004 singles
2004 songs
Macaronic songs
Protest songs
Rammstein songs
Satirical songs
Songs about the United States
Songs written by Richard Z. Kruspe
Songs written by Paul Landers
Songs written by Till Lindemann
Songs written by Christian Lorenz
Songs written by Oliver Riedel
Songs written by Christoph Schneider
Songs of the Iraq War
Universal Music Group singles